The 80th Infantry Regiment was an infantry regiment in the Imperial Japanese Army. The regiment was attached to the 40th Infantry Brigade of the 20th Division. The regiment participated during the Second Sino-Japanese War and during the later stages of World War II, the regiment was in New Guinea, as part of the Japanese Eighteenth Army.

Organization
1st Battalion
2nd Battalion
3rd Battalion

Commanders
Sadahiko Miyake (1940–1944)

Infantry Regiments (Imperial Japanese Army)